SC Real Mississauga is a Canadian soccer club based in Mississauga, Ontario that plays in the unsanctioned Canadian Soccer League.

History
The club joined the Canadian Soccer League in 2018 with a team in the First Division,  The club was originally formed as an academy by Krum Bibishkov. Bibishkov would also serve as the head coach for the 2018 season. Goalkeeper Sinead Poracanin scored the opening goal in a 2-0 victory over Brantford Galaxy on September 7, 2018 on a penalty kick.
They finished their debut season in seventh place in the nine team league, qualifying for the playoffs.

The club provides free soccer workshops to students in Dufferin-Peel Catholic District School Board schools.

Seasons 
Men

References

Sport in Mississauga
Canadian Soccer League (1998–present) teams
Soccer clubs in Ontario